Yolande of Dampierre, also Yolande of Flanders, Yolande of Kassel of Yolande of Bar  (15 September 1326 – 12 December 1395), was a descendant of the family of the dukes of Dampierre.

Biography 
Yolande was the daughter of Robert of Cassel, lord of Marle and Cassel and Joan of Brittany. Guy, Count of Flanders was her great-grandfather.

Yolande's older brother John died in 1332, when she was six.  She then inherited the lands of Cassel in the duchy of Flanders.  She was first betrothed to Louis of Male, but would end up marrying Henry IV, count of Bar in 1338.

Battle for regency 
Henry died four years later and Yolande was left with two children, Edward II, duke of Bar (1339-1352) and Robert (1344-1411). Yolande took over the regency until her son came of age.  However,  Peter of Bar, lord of Pierrepont, and Theobald, lord of Pierrepont, also felt they had a claim to the regency. They attacked Yolande, who managed to get them to back down by forming alliances with Philip VI of France and Rudolph, Duke of Lorraine.

Yolande's oldest son Edward was declared of age when he was ten, on the 10th of October 1349. Edward died in 1352 and his brother Robert was proclaimed duke at only seven years old.

Yolande would go on to marry Philip, Count of Longueville.

Yolande died on December 13 at  La Motte-aux-Bois Castle in Nieppe.

References
 P.J.E. DE SMYTTERE, Essai historique sur Iolande de Flandre comtesse de Bar et de Longueville, baronne de Montmirail et d'Alluye, Dame de Cassel, Eijsel, 1877.
L.D. BEZEGHER, La top 'dynamique' Yolande de Flandre comtesse de Bar, Cassel (1326-1395), in: Plein Nord, La Gazette, 1980.
 R. DELACHENAL, Histoire de Charles V, Parijs, 1916.
Jacques SABBE, Yolande van Vlaanderen, gravin van Bar en vrouwe van Cassel, en het huis de 'Casselberg' in Brugge, in: Handelingen van het Genootschap voor geschiedenis te Brugge, 2001.
Michelle BUBENICEK, Yolande de Flandre. Quand les femmes gouvernent. Droit et politique au XIVe siècle, 2002.

House of Dampierre

1326 births

1395 deaths